Sara Aliza Eisen (born August 7, 1984) is a financial news anchor for CNBC.

Education
Eisen attended New York University as an undergraduate and completed her graduate studies at Northwestern University.

Career
Eisen worked for Bloomberg Television where she was initially a Bloomberg Radio host and subsequently the television co-anchor of Bloomberg Surveillance. In 2013, she was hired by CNBC to co-host Worldwide Exchange and Squawk on the Street.

On March 12, 2018, Brian Sullivan replaced Eisen (and co-anchor Wilfred Frost) as anchor of Worldwide Exchange. Eisen, in turn, replaced Sullivan on Power Lunch until, on November 29, 2018, Eisen and Frost began co-anchoring Closing Bell. She continued to co-anchor Squawk on the Street until June 22, 2020. In March 2023, she returned to Squawk on the Street as co-presenter.

Personal life
Eisen is married to Matthew Levine, the former head of US programming at Bloomberg Television. Together, they have two children. 

Eisen serves on Room to Read's New York regional board.

References

1984 births
Living people
New York University alumni
Northwestern University alumni
American broadcast news analysts
Television personalities from Cincinnati
CNBC people
NBC News people
Jewish American journalists